New Worlds Fair is a 1975 concept album by UK rock group Michael Moorcock & The Deep Fix.

Moorcock was an established science fiction author who has contributed lyrics and occasionally performed with Hawkwind. In 1974 he was offered a record deal by Andrew Lauder, Hawkwind's A&R man for United Artists Records, although Moorcock insisted that his compatriots Steve Gilmore and Graham Charnock should have significant input into the album.

The single "Dodgem Dude"/"Starcruiser" had been recorded just prior to the album, but United Artists passed on the idea of releasing it. Some time later as Moorcock was visiting his former manager Douglas Smith, with whom he was in dispute, he discovered the tapes for the single lying around the office. Without Smith's knowledge he took them, passing them onto Frenchy Gloder, who gave the single a belated release on his Flicknife Records label (FLS200, December 1980).

The album has received two re-releases featuring various bonus tracks, in 1995 on Griffin (USA) and Dojo (UK), and in 2008 on Esoteric (UK). In 2004, Voiceprint Records released an alternate version of the album as Roller Coaster Holiday.

Track list

Side One 
 "Candy Floss Cowboy" (Michael Moorcock)
 "Fair Dealer" (Moorcock)
 "Octopus" (Steve Gilmore)
 "Sixteen Year Old Doom" (Moorcock)
 "You're A Hero" (Graham Charnock)
 "Song For Marlene" (Sam Shepard/Gilmore)

Side Two 
 "Come To The Fair" (Charnock)
 "In The Name Of Rock And Roll" (Charnock)
 "Ferris Wheel" (Gilmore)
 "Last Merry Go Round" (Moorcock)
 "Dude's Dream (Rolling In The Ruins)" (Moorcock)

2007 bonus tracks 
 "Dodgem Dude" (Moorcock)
 "The Brothel In Rossenstrasse" (Moorcock/Pavli)
 "Starcruiser" (Moorcock)
 "Candy Floss Cowboy" (Demo) (Moorcock)
 "Kings Of Speed" (Previously Unreleased) (Moorcock)
 "You're A Hero" (Demo - Previously Unreleased) (Moorcock)
 "Dodgem Dude" (First Demo - Previously Unreleased) (Moorcock)

1995 version 
 "Candy Floss Cowboy" (narration) (Moorcock) – 1:20
 "Candy Floss Cowboy" (demo) (Moorcock) – 4:26
 "Fair Dealer" (Moorcock) – 5:07
 "Narration 1" (Moorcock) – 0:34
 "Octopus" (Gilmore) – 2:27
 "16 Year Doom" (Moorcock) – 4:16
 "You're a Hero" (intro) (Moorcock) – 0:12
 "You're a Hero" (Charnock) – 3:11
 "Song For Marlene" (intro) (Moorcock) – 0:17
 "Song For Marlene" (Shepard/Gilmore) – 5:09
 "Dodgem Dude" (Moorcock) – 2:45
 "Come to the Fair" (Charnock) – 1:20
 "Starcruiser" (Moorcock) – 3:14
 "Narration 3" (Moorcock) – 0:24
 "In the Name of Rock and Roll" (Charnock) – 4:07
 "Narration 4" (Moorcock) – 0:32
 "Ferris Wheel" (Gilmore) – 5:56
 "Narration 5" (Moorcock) – 0:19
 "Last Merry Go Round" (Moorcock) – 2:11
 "Dude's Dream" (narration) (Moorcock) – 0:14
 "Dude's Dream" (Moorcock) – 4:42
 "Brothel in Rosenstrasse" (Moorcock/Peter Pavli) – 3:44

Roller Coaster Holiday 
 "Candy Floss Cowboy" (Moorcock) – 4:39
 "Fair Dealer" (Moorcock) – 5:28
 "Octopus" (Gilmore) – 2:27
 "Sixteen Year Old Doom" (Moorcock) – 4:28
 "You're a Hero" (Charnock) – 4:16
 "Song for Marlene" (Gilmore, Shepard) – 4:22
 "Dodgem Dude" (Moorcock) – 3:03
 "Come to the Fair" (Charnock) – 1:24
 "Starcruiser" (Moorcock) – 3:19
 "In the Name of Rock and Roll" (Charnock) – 4:34
 "Ferris Wheel" (Gilmore) – 5:30
 "Last Merry-Go-Round" (Moorcock) – 2:24
 "Dude's Dream (Rolling in the Ruins)" (Moorcock) – 5:00
 "Candy Floss Cowboy" (early workout) (Moorcock) – 6:04
 "Starcruiser" (instrumental) (Moorcock) – 3:43
 "Dude's Dream" (acoustic different lyrics) (Moorcock) – 5:15

Personnel 
 Michael Moorcock – Guitar, Mandolin, Vocals
 Graham Charnock – Guitar, Vocals
 Steve Gilmore – Guitar, Vocals
 Kuma Harada – Bass
 Peter Pavli – Cello

 with
 Snowy White – Guitar
 Herbert North – Guitar
 Nik Turner – Saxophone
 Dave Brock – Guitar
 Simon House – Violin, Keyboards
 Simon King – Drums
 Alan Powell – Drums
 Shirley Roden – Vocals
 Debi Ross – Vocals

Credits 
 Recorded: Jackson's Studios & Pye Studios, London 1974–1975, also at Majestic Studio Clapham, and Olympic, Barnes.
 Cover: Barney Bubbles

Release history 
 March 1975: UK, United Artists (UAG 29732), vinyl
 March 1995: USA, Griffin Music(GCD 332 2), CD Box Set with hardback book "Death Is No Obstacle"
 May 1995: UK, Dojo Records (DOJOCD 088), CD
 8 November 2004: Roller Coaster Holiday, UK, Voiceprint Records (VP351CD), CD
 January 2008: UK, Esoteric Records (ECLEC 2026), CD

References

External links 
 Moorcock's Miscellany - New World's Fair Lyrics

1975 albums
Concept albums
United Artists Records albums
Works by Michael Moorcock